Kálmán Kovács (3 March 1911 – August 1982) was a Hungarian international football player. He played for the club Szegedi Kolozsvári Egyetemi AC. He participated with the Hungary national football team at the 1936 Summer Olympics in Berlin.

References

1911 births
1982 deaths
Footballers at the 1936 Summer Olympics
Olympic footballers of Hungary
Hungarian footballers
Association footballers not categorized by position